Aldo A. DeAngelis (March 13, 1931 – February 13, 2004) was an American politician and businessman.

Born in Chicago Heights, Illinois, DeAngelis graduated from Bloom High School. He served as a public information officer in the United States Army from 1954 to 1956. DeAngelis graduated from Knox College in Galesburg, Illinois. He also sent to University of Chicago and Governors State University. He moved to Texas and started a steel and tube company. He then moved back to Chicago Heights, Illinois, and started the Vulcan Metal and Tube Company. 
DeAngelis ran for Illinois Senate in the 1978 general election. In the Republican primary, DeAngelis defeated State Representative Thomas Miller, the preferred candidate of Governor James R. Thompson. In the general election, DeAngelis defeated Democratic incumbent Robert Lane. He served in the Illinois State Senate from 1979 to 1997. DeAngelis then sold his business. During the 1990s, DeAngelis served as a member of the Illinois Republican Party Central Committee from Illinois's 4th congressional district.

In 1990, he was the Republican nominee for President of the Cook County Board of Commissioners. While he lost that election, he was elected a member of the Cook County Board of Commissioners in the coinciding election for the board's members. After a quick turnaround between swearing in and resignation, former Mayor of Homewood Robert T. Gooley was sworn in as DeAngelis's successor on the county board. In the 1996 general election, Democratic candidate Debbie Halvorson, the Crete Township Clerk, defeated DeAngelis. After DeAngelis left the Illinois General Assembly, DeAngelis worked as a lobbyist and consultant. DeAngelis died of a heart attack at his home in Olympia Fields, Illinois.

Notes

1931 births
2004 deaths
People from Chicago Heights, Illinois
Military personnel from Illinois
Governors State University alumni
University of Chicago alumni
Knox College (Illinois) alumni
Businesspeople from Illinois
Republican Party Illinois state senators
20th-century American politicians
20th-century American businesspeople